Joe Nay (born May 10, 1934 in Berlin - died December 22, 1990 near Munich) was a German jazz musician, composer and drummer.

After studying guitar at the Berlin Conservatory, Nay studied under Kenny Clarke in Paris in 1959. Together with the pianist Jan Huydts and the bassist Peter Trunk, he founded the house band at the Berlin club Blue Note in the 1960s. This trio accompanied American musicians such as Roland Kirk, Don Byas, Dexter Gordon and Johnny Griffin.

He also played in the Michael Naura Quintet and, alongside Hartwig Bartz, Ralf Hübner and Klaus Weiss, developed into one of the most important German jazz drummers.

Later he played with Dusko Goykovich, Randy Brecker, Volker Kriegel, Ruby Braff and Jasper van't Hof. His Northern Lights ensemble, active at the end of the 1970s, included Johannes Faber, Andy Scherrer, Harry Pepl, Christoph Spendel and Adelhard Roidinger. In the 1980s he directed the group Message, in which musicians such as Harry Sokal and Paul Grabowsky played. He has worked on more than 80 LP or CD recordings.

He died from the consequences of an auto accident.

His son, Sebastian Nay, is also jazz drummer who works with the pianist Tine Schneider.

Discography
As leader
Message (1986)

As sideman
 Barbara Dennerlein: Be-Bab, 1985
 Wilton Gaynair: Alpharian, 1982
 Dusko Goykovich: It's About Blues Time, 1971
 Dusko Goykovich: After Hours, 1971
 Johnny Griffin: Body & Soul, 1990
 Dick Heckstall-Smith: Live 1990, with John Etheridge, Rainer Glas 1990
 Jan Huydts: Trio Conception, 1963
 Carmell Jones: Carmell Jones in Europe, 1969
 Volker Kriegel: Mild Maniac, 1974
 Volker Kriegel: Topical Harvest, 1975
 Tete Montoliu: Body & Soul (Enja, 1971 [1983])
 Tete Montoliu: It's About Blues Time, 1971
 Tete Montoliu: Recordando A Line, 1971
 Michael Naura: Michael Naura Quintet, 1963
 Michael Naura: Call, 1970
 Michael Naura: Rainbow Runner, 1973
 Fritz Pauer: Beat The Beat, 1966
 Fritz Pauer & Joe Nay: The Rambler, 1966
 Dieter Reith: Join Us, 1978
 Annie Ross & Pony Poindexter: Annie Ross and Pony Poindexter, 1966
 Kristian Schultze: Recreation, 1972
 Peter Trunk: Sincerely P. T., 1973
 Utopia: Utopia, 1973 (with Jimmy Jackson, Kristian Schulze, Olaf Kübler, Lothar Meid and other Amon Düül II members)

References 

1934 births
1990 deaths
German jazz drummers
Male drummers
Musicians from Berlin
Road incident deaths in Germany
German male jazz musicians
20th-century German male musicians